Rust Heinz (October 18, 1914 – July 24, 1939)  was famed for designing the 1938 Phantom Corsair, a prototype car built on a Cord 810 chassis by the coach builder Bohman & Schwartz, incorporating a Lycoming 190 bhp V8 engine, weighing two tons and had seating capacity for six people.

The Phantom Corsair project was helped by finance from his aunt.  Following his death, the car was never mass-produced and the prototype remains the only one ever made.

Background 
Heinz was born in 1914 in Pittsburgh, Pennsylvania.  He was the second son of Howard Covode Heinz and Elizabeth Granger Heinz and grandson of the late Henry J. Heinz who founded the Heinz empire and was the brother of Henry John "Jack" Heinz, II.

In 1937 he married Helen Clay Goodloe, and together had a daughter Helen Meredith Dewitt Heinz.

Heinz studied Naval Architecture at Yale University and Westlawn Academy of Yacht Design  and designed a number of speedboats,. He abandoned his studies in 1936 and went to live with his aunt in Pasadena. He set up a design studio and established himself as an automobile designer in California, to pursue a passion he held since 1936 when he was 21 years old, where he designed a delivery vehicle called the Comet for the Heinz company, which was built by the Square Deal Body Company on an Autocar chassis intended to be used for promotional work.

He then designed the Phantom Corsair.

Death 
Heinz was killed on July 24, 1939, in a car accident at Westinghouse Bridge in Wilkinsburg, Pennsylvania.

Heinz had allowed his friend Phil Brainard to drive his open Buick home from a dance he was attending. During the journey Brainard's trilby hat flew off.

After a detour to collect the hat, the Buick ventured back on to the Lincoln Highway near Versailles and was broadsided by an unseen vehicle.

Six people were injured in the crash and Heinz died the following morning from head injuries.

Heinz is buried at Homewood Cemetery, Pittsburgh, Pennsylvania in a private mausoleum (section 14, lot 61, grave 7) with other family members.

Other family members also interred in the mausoleum include Robert Eugene Heinz (1899, grave 8), Henry J Heinz (1919, grave 4), Clarence Noble Heinz (1920, grave 6), Clifford S Heinz (1935, grave 3), Howard Heinz (1941, grave 5), Elizabeth Rust Heinz (1952, grave 1), Henrietta D Heinz (1954, grave 2), Dorothy Louise Heinz (1979, grave 4).

See also 
Phantom Corsair
Jack Heinz
Henry J. Heinz

References 

1939 deaths
American people of German descent
Heinz people
1914 births
People from Sharpsburg, Pennsylvania
Heinz family
Burials at Homewood Cemetery
Concept cars
Yale University alumni
20th-century American inventors
Road incident deaths in Pennsylvania